The  is a Japanese all-female musical theatre troupe based in Takarazuka, Hyōgo Prefecture, Japan. Women play all roles in lavish, Broadway-style productions of Western-style musicals and stories adapted from films, novels,  manga, and Japanese folktales. The Takarazuka Revue Company is a division of the Hankyu Railway company; all members of the troupe are employed by Hankyu.

History

The Takarazuka Revue was founded by Ichizō Kobayashi, an industrialist-turned-politician and president of Hankyu Railways, in Takarazuka, Japan in 1913. The city was the terminus of a Hankyu line from Osaka and already a popular tourist destination because of its hot springs. Kobayashi believed that it was the ideal spot to open an attraction of some kind that would boost train ticket sales and draw more business to Takarazuka. Since Western song and dance shows were becoming more popular and Kobayashi considered the kabuki theater to be old and elitist, he decided that an all-female theater group might be well received by the general public.

The Revue had its first performance in 1914. Today, the company owns and operates another theater, the Takarazuka Theater, in Tokyo. Currently Takarazuka performs for 2.5 million people each year and the majority of its fans are women.

Part of the novelty of Takarazuka is that all the parts are played by women, based on the original model of kabuki before 1629 when women were banned from the theater in Japan. Collectively, the Takarazuka performers are called "Takarasiennes". This name derives from the revue's fondness of the French revues.

The costumes, set designs and lighting are lavish, the performances melodramatic. Side pathways extend the already wide proscenium, accommodating elaborate processions and choreography.

Regardless of the era of the musical presented, period accuracy is relaxed for costumes during extravagant finales which include scores of glittering performers parading down an enormous stage-wide staircase and a Rockette-style kick line. Lead performers portraying both male and female roles appear in the finale wearing huge circular feathered back-pieces reminiscent of Las Vegas or Paris costuming.

Before becoming a member of the troupe, a young woman must train for two years in the Takarazuka Music School, one of the most competitive of its kind in the world. Each year, thousands from all over Japan audition. The 40 to 50 who are accepted are trained in music, dance, and acting, and are given seven-year contracts. The school is famous for its strict discipline and its custom of having first-year students clean the premises each morning.

Those playing  cut their hair short, take on a more masculine role in the classroom, and speak in the masculine form.

Flower and Moon are the original troupes, founded in 1921. Snow Troupe was founded in 1924 and Star Troupe in 1931, disbanded in 1939, and reestablished in 1948. Cosmos, founded in 1998, is the newest troupe.

Actors

Though Takarazuka Revue gives the appearance of having been created to grant Japanese women freedom from social oppression, ironically, it was created with the opposite intention, with Takarazuka scholar Lorie Brau stating that "The production office and corporate structure that control Takarazuka are overwhelmingly patriarchal." However, although Takarazuka embodies Shiraishi's idea that the actresses become "good wives and wise mothers" upon leaving the company, it also simultaneously represents progressive feminist points of view. Some believe that its appeal to the female audience is on account of the perceived link to freedom from traditional Japanese society's imposed ideas of gender and sexuality. Brau states that while the Takarazuka Revue "reinforces the status quo and sublimates women's desires through its dreamy narratives, there remains some possibility that certain spectators find it empowering simply to watch women play men."

Some Takarasienne shows, such as The Rose of Versailles and Elisabeth, feature androgynous characters. In Brau's view, the  represents the woman's idealized man, free from the roughness or need to dominate found in real life. It is these male roles that offer an escape from the strict, gender-bound real roles lauded in Japanese society. In a sense, the  provides the female audience with a "dream" of what they desire in reality.

In addition to their claim to "sell dreams", the actresses of the Takarazuka Revue take on another role, empowering themselves as women in a male-dominated culture. Kobayashi's desire to make his actresses into good wives and mothers has often been hindered by their own will to pursue careers in the entertainment business. It is becoming increasingly more common for women to stay in the company well into their thirties, beyond the perceived conventional limits of marriageable age. The actresses' role within the Takarazuka Revue thus overlaps into the culture surrounding it, adding to their appeal to the female-dominant audience. "In fact, it is the carrying over of this 'boyishness' into everyday life and the freedom that this implies that captures the attention of some fans."

The , however, is not bound to her assigned male role in the theater. Tsurugi Miyuki, top  star of the Moon Troupe, said that she conceived male impersonation as just a "role" that she wore like the makeup and costume that helped create her  image. She said she reverts to her nonperforming "feminine" self after performance. Other  feel uncomfortable switching to female roles.  Matsu Akira, who retired in 1982, stated: "Even though I am a female, the thing called 'female' just won't emerge at all."

Although traditionally an all-female troupe, in 1946 the Takarazuka employed male performers who were trained separately from the female members of the troupes. Ultimately, however, the female members opposed these new male counterparts, and the department was dissolved, the last male department terminating in 1954. A 2007 Japanese musical, Takarazuka Boys, was based on this chapter of the company's history.

While the casts are all-female, the staff (writers, directors, choreographers, designers, etc.) and orchestra musicians may be male or female. It is not uncommon in Takarazuka for a predominantly male orchestra to be led by a female conductor.

Troupes
The five  of the Takarazuka Revue have certain differences of style and material which make each unique.

Flower Troupe
Many of the most popular former and current top stars of the company originated in Flower Troupe; these include Miki Maya (who held the first Budokan solo concert in Takarazuka's history), Sumire Haruno and Tomu Ranju of Flower, Jun Shibuki, Jun Sena and Kiriya Hiromu of Moon, and Hikaru Asami of Snow. Their performances tend to have larger budgets, with lavish stage and costume designs, and are often derived from operatic material.

Moon Troupe
While tending to be a home for young performers (with Yūki Amami in her sixth year reaching the status of top star in the 1990s), the members of Moon Troupe are also strong singers. The term "Musical Research Department" is occasionally used in articles about the troupe, underscoring the troupe's focus on music. Their material tends toward drama, Western musicals, and modern settings, such as Guys and Dolls and Me and My Girl. During the era of Makoto Tsubasa as top star, they had at least two musicals adopted from classic western novels.

Snow Troupe
Snow Troupe is considered the upholder of traditional dance and opera for the whole company, being the vanguard of traditional Japanese drama in a company that tends towards Western material. They were the first troupe to perform Elisabeth in Japan. The troupe has been moving towards the opera and drama style of Moon and Flower.

Star Troupe
Star Troupe tends to be the home of Takarazuka's stars. They, along with Flower Troupe, have very strong  players. In recent years, many of the company's prominent  have also originated from Star Troupe, such as Hana Hizuki, Shizuku Hazakura, and Yuki Aono.

Cosmos Troupe
Cosmos, the newest troupe, is less traditional and more experimental. When it was first formed, it culled talent from the other troupes. The Cosmos style is influenced by performers like Asato Shizuki, the founding  top star; Yōka Wao and Mari Hanafusa, the "Golden Combi" who headed the troupe for six of its first eight years. Cosmos were the first troupe to perform Phantom and to have a Broadway composer (Frank Wildhorn) write their musical score. While it had a troupe-born actress become  top back in 2006 with Asuka Toono, it was not until 2014 that an actress originating from this troupe became an  top star: Seina Sagiri, the former top star of Snow Troupe (2014–2017).

Types of musicals performed

Adaptations of Western works
While the majority of Takarazuka works are written "in house" by members of the creative staff, they are often adapted from Western classic musicals, operas, plays, novels or films:

Novels: 
 Anne Golon's Angélique series
 Alexander Pushkin's The Captain's Daughter (as Dark Brown Eyes) and Eugene Onegin
 Alexandre Dumas's The Count of Monte Cristo
 Anthony Hope's The Prisoner of Zenda
 Antoine François Prévost's Manon Lescaut
 Charles Dickens's A Tale of Two Cities and Great Expectations
 Edith Wharton's The Age of Innocence
 Emily Brontë's Wuthering Heights
 Erich Maria Remarque's Arch of Triumph
 Ernest Hemingway's For Whom the Bell Tolls
 F. Scott Fitzgerald's The Great Gatsby, The Last Tycoon and The Diamond as Big as the Ritz
 Fyodor Dostoyevsky's The Brothers Karamazov
 Henry Fielding's Tom Jones
 Jane Austen's Pride and Prejudice
 James Hilton's Random Harvest
 John Steinbeck's East of Eden
 Johnston McCulley's Zorro
 Leo Tolstoy's Anna Karenina and War and Peace
 Margaret Mitchell's Gone with the Wind
 Oscar Wilde's The Picture of Dorian Gray
 Pierre Choderlos de Laclos's  (as Romanesque Mask)
 Prosper Mérimée's Carmen (as Passion: Jose and Carmen)
 Stendhal's The Red and the Black and The Charterhouse of Parma (as Passionate Barcelona)
 Vicente Blasco Ibáñez's Blood and Sand

Films:
An Officer and a Gentleman
Bonnie and Clyde
Casablanca
 (as At the End of a Long Spring)
Farewell My Concubine/The Phantom Lover (as Singing in the Moonlight)
JFK
Sabrina
Somewhere in Time
Ocean's 11
Once Upon a Time in America
Operas:
Aida (under the name Song of the Kingdom)
 (as Love Sonata)
 (as A Kiss To The Flames)
The Tales of Hoffmann
 (as Elegy)
Turandot (as Legend of the Phoenix: Calaf & Turandot)
Véronique
Andrea Chénier (as The Poem of Love and Revolution ~Andrea Chénier~)

Madame Butterfly (as Concise , 1931)

Musicals:

The Apple Tree
Anastasia (musical)
Can-Can
Chicago
Catch me if you can
Cinderella
Copacabana
Elisabeth
Ernest in Love (an adaptation of The Importance of Being Earnest)
Flower Drum Song
Grand Hotel
Guys and Dolls
How to Succeed in Business Without Really Trying
I am from Austria
Kean
Kiss Me Kate

Me and My Girl
Mozart, l'opéra rock
Oklahoma!
On a Clear Day You Can See Forever
One Touch of Venus
Phantom

Singin' in the Rain
The Scarlet Pimpernel
The Sound of Music
West Side Story

Plays:
 Shakespeare's Romeo and Juliet, Twelfth Night,  Julius Caesar (under the name Rome at Dawn), Much Ado About Nothing, The Winter's Tale and Hamlet
 John Fletcher and Shakespeare's The Two Noble Kinsmen
 Goethe's Faust

Adaptations of Japanese works

Among the most common of these adapted to the Takarazuka stage is The Tale of Genji.

Popular manga series have often shaped Takarazuka, such as in the case of Riyoko Ikeda's The Rose of Versailles. Other manga adaptations include The Window of Orpheus, also by Ikeda, Osamu Tezuka's Black Jack and Phoenix, and Yasuko Aoike's El Halcón.

Recent examples of works adapted from Japanese novels or short stories include Moon Troupe's , based upon the short story by Ryōtarō Shiba, and Flower Troupe's , based upon the Kogoro Akechi story by Edogawa Rampo.

In 2009, Takarazuka Revue performed two shows based on an adaptation of Capcom's video game series Ace Attorney. They took the stage in January 2013 to represent the courtroom game again with the production titled Prosecutor Miles Edgeworth: Ace Attorney 3. In June 2013, the Revue would debut at Tokyo's Tokyu Theatre Orb an adaptation of another Capcom video game, done by the Flower Troupe. This focused on character Yukimura Sanada, played by Tomu Ranju, the same actress who had taken the role of Phoenix Wright prior to becoming a top star.

In 2019, the Flower Troupe also performed a stage adaptation of the  manga series Boys Over Flowers. In August 2022, the Cosmos Troupe are set to perform a stage adaptation of the series High & Low in collaboration with LDH.

Adaptations of other Asian works

Among works adapted from other Asian sources is the Beijing opera The Hegemon-King Bids His Concubine Farewell, detailing the romance between General Xiang Yu and his lover Madam Yu.

Original stories and historical adaptations
Musicals have also been performed throughout the years based upon people and events in American, European, and Asian history. Among the more recognizable of these biographical adaptations are Last Party: S. Fitzgerald's Last Day, about F. Scott Fitzgerald; Valentino, about Rudolph Valentino; Dean, about James Dean; and Saint-Exupéry: The Pilot Who Became "The Little Prince", about Antoine de Saint-Exupéry.

Finally, original stories round out Takarazuka fare, including musicals such as Boxman by Cosmos Troupe, Too Short a Time to Fall in Love performed by Star and Moon Troupes, and Silver Wolf by Moon and Snow Troupes.

Collaborations
Takarazuka has occasionally worked with notable writers, composers, and choreographers to create original content for the revue. In 1993, Tommy Tune wrote, directed and choreographed the revue Broadway Boys to accompany Moon Troupe's rendition of Grand Hotel. In 2006, Takarazuka worked with Frank Wildhorn, musical writer and composer of Jekyll & Hyde and The Scarlet Pimpernel, to create  Never Say Goodbye for Cosmos Troupe.

Personnel

Star personnel 

The current top stars of each group are:

Other main performers in the company

Seniority
Lowerclassmen are the actresses who have been performers in Takarazuka for less than seven years. After the seventh year they become upperclassmen, and negotiate contracts with the company instead of being employed by it.

Former Takarasiennes
Takarazuka roster members who went on to work in stage, movies, and television include:

Audience
Women make up the primary audience of Takarazuka; in fact, some estimates say the audience is 90 percent female. There exist two primary theories as to what draws these women to Takarazuka. These theories, put forward by Western scholars, complement each other, drawing on the traditional homoerotic elements of Japanese performing arts, and the ancient subversive nature of the feminine in Japan. One is that the women are drawn to its inherent lesbian overtones. One author states, "It was not masculine sexuality which attracted the Japanese girl audience but it was feminine eroticism".

Favoring the first theory, American Jennifer Robertson observes that lesbian themes occur in every Takarazuka performance, simply by virtue of the fact that women play every role. The audience clearly picks up on it and responds. Within the first ten years of Takarazuka's founding, the audience was vocally responding to the apparent lesbianism. In 1921 these letters were published and several years later newspapers and the public rallied a cry against Takarazuka, claiming it was quickly becoming a "symbol of abnormal love". In order to combat this, the producers kept its actresses in strict living conditions; they were no longer allowed to associate with their fans. Robertson mentions a phenomenon of "S" or "Class S" love, a particular style of love wherein women who have been influenced by Takarazuka return to their daily lives feeling free to develop crushes on their female classmates or coworkers. This type of romance is typically fleeting and is seen in Japanese society as more of a phase in growing up rather than "true" homosexuality. Robertson sums up her theory thus: "Many [women] are attracted to the Takarazuka  because she represents an exemplary female who can negotiate successfully both genders and their attendant roles and domains."

The other theory, supported by Canadian Erica Abbitt, is that the female audience of Takarazuka is drawn not exclusively by lesbian overtones, but rather by the subversion of stereotypical gender roles. Japan is a society notorious for its rigid conception of gender roles. While the original goal of the show may have been to create the ideal good wife and wise mother off stage, on-stage gender roles are, by necessity, subverted. The  must act the way men are supposed to act. Abbitt insists that a large portion of the appeal of Takarazuka comes from something she calls "slippage", referring to the enjoyment derived from a character portraying something they are not, in this case a woman portraying a man. While not denying the presence of lesbian overtones within Takarazuka, Abbitt proposes the cause for the largely female audience has more to do with this subversion of societal norms than sexual ones. In essence, the role of  presents a type of androgynous freedom that embraces slippage and a non-constrained continuum of gender. While the actual female  performer's masculine persona or "secondary gender" was disapproved of outside of the theatrical purposes of Takarazuka, female fans were able to embrace the full gender-fluid continuum otokoyaku provided, as well as engage with Takarazuka in the context of a gender-sex political discourse.

Fan clubs

Some fans demonstrate their loyalty to a particular performer by joining her fan club. Club members can be identified by their wearing scarves of a particular color or even jackets colorfully embroidered with the star's name. Following performances at the Takarazuka Grand Theatre or Tokyo Takarazuka Theatre, as many as several hundred fans congregate in their various club groups and stand in orderly ranks on either side of the street in front of the theatre. The clubs are arranged by actress seniority within the troupe. Theatre officials set up barricades and oversee the assembly.

Whenever an actress exits the theatre, the frontmost group will sit and all the others follow suit (much like the "wave" seen in athletic arenas) with subsequent intervals of standing and sitting. The fans wait patiently, with little conversation, for their favorites to exit the theatre. An almost eerie ritualistic calm prevails. As the stars come out of the building one by one, some alone but most accompanied by staff members of their club, orderly quiet continues to prevail. The glamorous performers, now mostly in slacks or jeans with high heels and wearing oversize visored "newsboy" caps to hide their hair (and some with sunglasses even at night), move along to their own particular fan clubs. Rather than requesting autographs, the fans proffer cards, which are gathered efficiently by each star, who may say a few words but then waves and moves on. Once the last stars have emerged and departed, the clubs disband quietly.

Influence
Takarazuka has had a profound influence on the history of anime and manga, especially  manga. Osamu Tezuka, a highly influential manga creator, grew up in the town of Takarazuka. His mother knew many of the Takarazuka actresses, and as a child he knew them and watched many of their performances. Based on their stories of noble princes played by female actresses, Tezuka created Princess Knight, the first manga aimed at a female audience, which tells the story of Princess Sapphire, a girl born with both a male and female heart who struggles between the desire to fight as a noble prince and to be a tender, gentle princess. The great success of Princess Knight and other Tezuka stories began the tradition of manga written for a female audience, especially the very influential The Rose of Versailles and Revolutionary Girl Utena series, both of which borrow directly from Princess Knight by including specific Tezuka images, character designs and names. The Rose of Versailles is one of Takarazuka's best-known musicals.

While the influence of Osamu Tezuka and Takarazuka on anime and manga is general, there are still many series which show more specific influences. The Takarazuka Revue inspired the plot of the original Sakura Wars video game, along with additional inspiration from Takarazuka's one-time competitor the Shochiku Kagekidan (Shochiku Revue).

The Zuka Club in Ouran High School Host Club is based on the Takarazuka Revue.

The lesbian characters Haruka Tenou and Michiru Kaiou of Sailor Moon were loosely based on the actors of the Takarazuka Revue.

The Virgin's Mask by Jūrō Kara, a significant work of post-war theater, features an aging "-girl" attempting to reclaim her youth through ritualistic bathing in a tub of virgins' tears.

The musical anime series Revue Starlight has elements based on the troupe, including uniforms, the school seal, and theater style, and makes use of these elements to present a critique of Takarazuka practices, particularly the Top Star system.

The Tokyo theater group  ("Fur Tribe") has produced homosexual parodies of classic Takarazuka shows like Gone with the Wind.

The manga and anime series  follows two teenage girls enrolled in a fictional version of the Takarazuka Music School. There, they train in singing, acting, and dancing, in hopes of joining the infamous all-female theatre troupe. One of the girls, Sarasa, dreams of playing Oscar François de Jarjayes in the theatre's production of Rose of Versailles.

The one episode of the anime series Stop!! Hibari-kun! features Wataru Otori, an eccentric drag king who takes on the role of Rhett Butler for the Gone with the Wind play.

Takarazuka and homosexuality in Japanese society

Women wore militaristic uniforms, heightening the attraction even more among some audience goers. There was another scandal in 1932 when, for the first time, one of the  cut her hair short (previously all of the actresses had their hair long and the  simply hid their hair under hats). In August 1940, the actresses were even forbidden to answer fan mail and socialize with their admirers. In the years since then, the regulations have relaxed but not by much.

Legacy
In the 1957 film Sayonara, set largely in neighboring Kobe, the all-female "Matsubayashi" theater troupe bears many similarities to the Takarazuka Revue.

A 1996 black-and-white photograph of a Takarasienne, taken by Daido Moriyama, appeared on the October 1999 cover of Art in America.

See also
 Films from Takarazuka Revue produced by Takarazuka Eiga
 Breeches role
 Cross-dressing
 Drag (clothing)

References

General references

 
 The Politics of Androgyny in Japan: Sexuality and Subversion in the Theater and Beyond Jennifer Robertson American Ethnologist, Vol. 19, No. 3 (Aug., 1992), pp. 419-442.

Further reading
 Leonie R. Stickland, Gender Gymnastics: Performing and Consuming Japan's Takarazuka Revue, Melbourne, Australia: Trans Pacific Press, 2008 Review of Gender Gymnastics
 Makiko Yamanashi, A History of the Takarazuka Revue Since 1914. Modernity, Girls' Culture, Japan Pop, Leiden: Global Oriental & Brill, 2012 Review of A History of the Takarazuka
 James Roberson and Nobue Suzuki, Men and Masculinities in Contemporary Japan: Beyond the Salaryman Doxa, London and New York: Routledge Curzon, 2003
 Alisa Roost. "Elisabeth". Theatre Journal. Vol 60.2.
 "Japanese tradition meets Western musicals"—Article on the Takarazuka Revue from the travel section of The Christian Science Monitor (20 April 2005).
 "Welcome to Romance Theatre", by K. Avila, Jade Magazine, March 2004.
 Anan, Nobuko (2016). Contemporary Japanese Women’s Theatre and Visual Arts. London: Palgrave Macmillan UK.

External links

 Official website: Japanese version, English version
 The Takarazuka Revue—A 1996 article originally published in Polare magazine
 The Takarazuka Concise Madame Butterfly, tr. by K. and L. Selden, introduced by A. Groos in Japan Focus 14, 14, 7 (July 2016)

 
Theatre companies in Japan
Tourist attractions in Hyōgo Prefecture
Musical theatre companies
Theatre in Japan
Performing arts in Japan
Hankyu Hanshin Holdings
Musical groups established in 1913
1913 establishments in Japan
Women in theatre
Women's organizations based in Japan
Women's musical groups
Takarazuka, Hyōgo